Cristiane Justino Venâncio (born July 9, 1985), known professionally by her ring name Cris Cyborg (and formerly by her married name Cristiane Santos), is a Brazilian-American mixed martial artist who as of January 2021 competes in Bellator MMA, where she is the current Bellator Women's Featherweight Champion, having held the title since January 2020. She is also a former UFC, Strikeforce and Invicta FC World Featherweight Champion. She is the only MMA fighter in history, male or female, to become a Grand Slam Champion, holding world championships across four major mixed martial arts promotions. Cyborg is widely regarded as one of the greatest female mixed martial artists of all time.

Cyborg first rose to prominence when she won the Strikeforce title on August 15, 2009, by defeating Gina Carano via first-round technical knock-out (TKO).

As of March 29, 2021, she is #1 in the Bellator Women's pound-for-pound Rankings.

Early life
Cyborg was born Cristiane Justino Venâncio on July 9, 1985 in Curitiba to Brazilian parents. A daughter of divorced parents and a father who had problems with alcoholism, Cristiane Justino started her sports career at the age of twelve, playing handball at a national level in Brazil. Due to her success in the sport, she won numerous athletic scholarships on private universities after her high school graduation, and eventually chose to pursue the path of physical education in the capital of Paraná, Curitiba. Later, she planned to move to the city of Cascavel to become a professional handball player and finish her college studies there, before being discovered by Rudimar Fedrigo, a Chute Boxe Academy trainer who was impressed by her physical size and advised her to enter the world of fighting.

Mixed martial arts career

Early career 
Justino, without yet incorporating the nickname "Cyborg", made her professional debut in mixed martial arts at the age of 19 on May 17, 2005 at Showfight 2 against multiple time world BJJ champion Erica Paes. Paes, who was five years her senior, was the first woman to train at the legendary Brazilian Top Team academy, a rival gym of the Chute Boxe gym where Cyborg trained. Cyborg lost the fight via submission in the first round, which remained her only professional loss in MMA until 2018, when she lost for the second time in her career against Amanda Nunes. Although the method of win for Paes was officially recorded as a submission due to a kneebar, Cyborg's team claims that she tapped out due to an elbow injury sustained after a fall in the fight.

After losing her MMA debut, Cyborg earned her first victory in the sport by defeating Vanessa Porto via unanimous decision. She subsequently won her next three fights in the Brazilian promotion Storm Samurai via first-round TKO finish, improving her record to 4-1.

She made her anticipated United States MMA debut on July 26, 2008, against Shayna Baszler at EliteXC: Unfinished Business. She won the fight by TKO in the second round.

She faced Yoko Takahashi on October 4, 2008, at EliteXC: Heat, winning the fight by unanimous decision.

She was scheduled to face Dutch submission specialist Marloes Coenen at XMMA 7 on February 27, 2009, but backed out of the fight after signing a new contract with Strikeforce. Cyborg earned a BJJ Purple Belt under her jiu-jitsu instructor Cristiano Marcello in 2009.

Strikeforce

She later signed to fight for Strikeforce, which greatly increased the chance that a fight with Gina Carano would take place. In her Strikeforce debut, she faced Hitomi Akano on April 11, 2009, at Strikeforce: Shamrock vs. Diaz. Cyborg came in six pounds overweight for the fight. Akano originally rejected the fight due to Cyborg failing to make weight but later accepted the fight. She defeated Akano by TKO in the third round.

Before the fight with Carano, Cyborg was interviewed by mmaworldwide.com's reporter Aaron Tru. When asked how long it would take to submit Carano with a choke hold, she choked him.

She fought Gina Carano on August 15, 2009, at Strikeforce: Carano vs. Cyborg for the Women's Featherweight Championship. Cyborg won via TKO at 4:59 of the 5:00 first round. The card was the first time that a major promotion had featured a main event between women. After the match, she hugged Carano, and stated in her interview that she had the utmost respect for Carano, and that it was an honor to fight her.

She next defended her title against Dutch standout Marloes Coenen at a Strikeforce event on January 30, 2010. She won the fight via TKO at 3:40 of round 3.

Strikeforce CEO Scott Coker stated that the next challenger for Cyborg would most likely be Erin Toughill. However, Toughill later announced her intentions to leave Strikeforce and plans for the fight were cancelled.

On April 7, 2010, Coker stated that Cyborg would fight again in June. She faced Jan Finney at Strikeforce: Fedor vs. Werdum and won the fight via KO in the second round. Her contract with Strikeforce expired on June 26, 2011. She renewed her Strikeforce contract on August 25, 2011.

Doping violations and suspension
On September 23, 2011, Cyborg announced that she would return to the promotion to face Hiroko Yamanaka. The fight took place at Strikeforce: Melendez vs. Masvidal on December 17, 2011. She won via TKO just sixteen seconds into the first round; however, on January 6, 2012, it was announced that Cyborg had tested positive for stanozolol, an anabolic steroid. As a result of the banned substance, the fight's result was changed to a no contest. Cyborg had her license suspended for one year and was fined $2,500.

Invicta Fighting Championships
On February 15, 2013, a month after Strikeforce folded, Cyborg signed a multi-fight deal with Invicta Fighting Championships. She was scheduled to make her debut on April 5 at Invicta FC 5: Penne vs. Waterson against Ediane Gomes to determine who would move on to face Marloes Coenen. However, Gomes suffered an injury and Cyborg instead faced Fiona Muxlow. Cyborg was successful in her return, winning the bout via TKO in the first round.

Cyborg faced Marloes Coenen in a rematch for the inaugural Invicta FC Featherweight Championship at Invicta FC 6: Coenen vs. Cyborg on July 13, 2013. She defeated Coenen by TKO in the fourth round to become the first Invicta FC featherweight champion.

She returned to Muay Thai to face Jennifer Colomb at Lion Fight 11 in Las Vegas on September 20, 2013, defeating the previously undefeated Frenchwoman by TKO in round three. She had initially been set to fight Martina Jindrova but Jindrova withdrew with injury.

She lost a five-round unanimous decision against Jorina Baars in a fight for the inaugural Lion Fight Women's Welterweight Championship in the co-main event of Lion Fight 14 in Las Vegas, Nevada, United States on March 28, 2014. Baars officially knocked down Cyborg in the first round with a head kick and in the fifth round with a spinning heel kick, although referee Tony Weeks missed at least two other occasions throughout the fight where a knockdown could have been issued. Cyborg hit the canvas from a front kick in one occasion and from a knee on another, both times they were ruled slips by the referee.

In February 2015, Cyborg returned to MMA to defend her Invicta Featherweight title against Charmaine Tweet in the main event at Invicta FC 11. She successfully defended her title, winning the fight via TKO in just under a minute in the first round.

Cyborg faced Faith Van Duin on July 9, 2015, at Invicta FC 13: Cyborg vs. Van Duin. She won the fight by TKO in the first round due to a knee to the body and punches.

Ultimate Fighting Championship
In March 2015, it was announced that Cyborg had signed with the UFC. Cyborg made her promotional debut at UFC 198 against Leslie Smith at a catchweight of 140 pounds. She won the fight by TKO in the first round.

Cyborg faced promotional newcomer Lina Länsberg in a catchweight (140 lb) bout on September 24, 2016, at UFC Fight Night 95. The referee stopped the fight midway through the second round after Länsberg could not effectively defend herself.

In December 2016 UFC was notified of a potential USADA doping violation by Cyborg. Cyborg's team immediately responded that it was in regards to a substance that helped her recover from her weight cut. On February 17, 2017, Cyborg was granted a retroactive therapeutic use exemption (TUE). Therefore, her suspension was lifted, and she was immediately eligible to compete.

In March 2017 Cyborg vacated her Invicta featherweight title and called out Germaine de Randamie for the belt targeting UFC 214 in Anaheim, California. The match fell apart since Germaine de Randamie refused to fight, stating that Cyborg was a proven drug cheater and she was willing to get stripped of the belt for not fighting Cyborg. De Randamie was stripped of her belt on June 19, 2017, by UFC and Cyborg was expected to face Megan Anderson to fight for the vacated UFC Women's Featherweight Championship at UFC 214 on July 29 in Anaheim, California. On June 27, Anderson pulled out of the fight due to personal reasons and was replaced by current Invicta FC Bantamweight Champion Tonya Evinger. Cyborg won by TKO in the third round to claim her first UFC championship.

In the first defense of her title and the first fight of her new four-fight contract, Cyborg faced Holly Holm on December 30, 2017, in the main event at UFC 219. She won the fight via unanimous decision. This win also earned her her first Fight of the Night bonus.

Cyborg faced former Invicta bantamweight champion, Yana Kunitskaya, on March 3, 2018, at UFC 222 for her second featherweight title defense. Cyborg won the fight by TKO in the first round. After the win, she gave out 222 burgers to Los Angeles' homeless, as her way of celebration.

Cyborg faced the reigning UFC Women's bantamweight champion, Amanda Nunes, for the UFC Women's Featherweight Championship on December 29, 2018, at UFC 232. Nunes defeated Cyborg by knockout early in the first round, handing her the first knockout loss in her MMA career.

Cyborg faced Felicia Spencer on July 27, 2019 at UFC 240 in the co-main event. She won the fight via unanimous decision.

Following the fight against Spencer, which was the last fight on her contract, UFC president Dana White announced that the UFC would not negotiate a new contract with Cyborg, and they would waive her three-month exclusive negotiating period. This allowed her to immediately begin negotiations with other organizations.

Bellator MMA
On September 3, 2019, it was announced Cyborg had signed a multi-fight deal with Bellator MMA.

Cyborg faced Julia Budd for the Bellator Women's Featherweight Championship on Saturday, January 25, 2020 in Inglewood, California Bellator 238. She won the fight via technical knockout in round four.

For the fight with Budd, Cyborg trained in South Africa with trainers Richie Quan, Boyd Allen, and Martin Van Staden. Her and her team's goal for the camp was to train for well-roundedness and to be ready for anything.

After winning her fourth World Championship, Cyborg has stated she would like to make an attempt at a belt in boxing.

In the first defense of her title, Cyborg faced Arlene Blencowe at Bellator 249 on October 15, 2020. She won the bout via second round submission, earning the first submission of her MMA career.

Cyborg made her second defense of the title against Leslie Smith on May 21, 2021 in the main event at Bellator 259. They previously met at UFC 198, which was Cyborg's UFC debut, where she won by TKO in the first round. She won the bout via TKO after knocking Smith down and finished her with punches late in the last round.

Cyborg defended her title against Sinead Kavanagh on November 12, 2021 at Bellator 271. After exchanging on the feet, Cyborg knocked Kavanagh out early in the first round.

Cyborg defended her title in a rematch against Arlene Blencowe on April 23, 2022 at Bellator 279. She retained the title and won the bout via unanimous decision. The following summer Cyborg became a free agent.

Boxing career 
Cyborg made her professional boxing debut on September 25, 2022, facing Simone Silva, a former Brazilian National Boxing Champion, at Fight Music Show 2. Silva had suffered a knockout loss due to a body punch a month prior to the fight and was suspended by the Texas Department of Licensing and Regulation, however Simone Silva was required to complete additional medicals that allowed the Associaçáo Paranaense De Lutas Commission to sanction the bout as a professional fight. Cyborg won the bout via unanimous decision.

In her sophomore performance on December 11, 2022 against Gabrielle Holloway as the co-main event under Terence Crawford vs. David Avanesyan at CHI Health Center in Omaha, she dropped Holloway and outpointed her on to a unanimous decision victory. The Event drew a paid attendance of 14,630 paid to set a state of Nebraska record for largest boxing gate.

Personal life
Cyborg was married to fellow mixed martial artist Evangelista "Cyborg" Santos, and "adopted" his nickname. The couple split in December 2011. She has been a naturalized U.S. citizen since 2016. Cyborg announced her engagement to longtime boyfriend, trainer, and former MMA athlete Ray Elbe in 2017.

In 2018, Cyborg legally adopted her teenage niece, making her historically the first mother to hold a UFC championship belt.

Cyborg works with Fight For The Forgotten, a non-profit organization organized by Justin Wren that digs wells to provide drinking water for Ugandan Pygmys. After earning her first submission victory in a 26-fight MMA career, she was awarded her BJJ Black Belt by Rubens 'Cobrinha' Charles.

Championships and accomplishments

Mixed martial arts
Bellator MMA 
Bellator MMA Women's Featherweight Championship (One time, current)
Four successful title defenses
Tied (with Arlene Blencowe) for the most stoppage wins in Bellator Women's Featherweight division history (four)
Ultimate Fighting Championship
UFC Women's Featherweight Championship (One time)
Two successful title defenses
Fight of the Night (One time) vs. Holly Holm
Most wins in UFC women's featherweight division (4)
Tied (with Megan Anderson and Felicia Spencer) for most knockouts in UFC Women's Featherweight division (two)
Strikeforce
Strikeforce Women's Featherweight World Championship (One time; First; Last; Only)
Two successful title defenses
2010 Female Fighter of the Year
Invicta Fighting Championships
Invicta FC Featherweight World Championship (One time; First)
Three successful title defenses
Performance of the Night (two times) vs. Charmaine Tweet and Faith Van Duin
World MMA Awards
2009 Female Fighter of the Year
2010 Female Fighter of the Year
Women's MMA Awards
2013 Featherweight of the Year
2011 Female Fan Favorite of the Year
2010 Female Featherweight of the Year
2009 Female Featherweight of the Year
2009 Headline of the Year w/ Gina Carano in Strikeforce: Carano vs. Cyborg
AwakeningFighters.com WMMA Awards
2013 Featherweight of the Year
Sherdog
2010 Beatdown of the Year vs. Jan Finney on June 26
2010 All-Violence Third Team
Sports Illustrated
2009 Female Fighter of the Year
Fight Matrix
2010 Female Fighter of the Year
MixedMartialArts.com
2009 Female Fighter of the Year
Examiner.com
2009 Female Fighter of the Year
MMADNA.nl
2016 Debut of the Year.

Submission grappling
International Brazilian Jiu-Jitsu Federation
2012 IBJJF World Jiu-Jitsu Championship Female Purple Belt Gold Medalist
2011 IBJJF World Jiu-Jitsu Championship Female Purple Belt Gold Medalist
Abu Dhabi Combat Club
2009 ADCC Submission Wrestling World Championship Bronze Medalist

Kickboxing
AwakeningFighters.com Muay Thai Awards
2014 Fight of the Year vs. Jorina Baars at Lion Fight 14

Amateur wrestling
Federação Paulista de Luta Olímpica
2007 Brazil Cup International Senior Women's Freestyle Gold Medalist
Federação Paranaense de Lutas Associadas
Paraná Senior Women's Freestyle State Championship (2007)

Mixed martial arts record

|-
| Win
| align=center| 26–2 (1) 
| Arlene Blencowe
| Decision (unanimous)
| Bellator 279
| 
| align=center|5
| align=center|5:00
| Honolulu, Hawaii, United States
|
|-
| Win
| align=center| 25–2 (1)
| Sinead Kavanagh
| KO (punches)
| Bellator 271
| 
| align=center|1 
| align=center|1:32
| Hollywood, Florida, United States
|
|-
|Win
|align=center|24–2 (1)
|Leslie Smith
| TKO (punches)
|Bellator 259 
|
|align=center|5
|align=center|4:51
|Uncasville, Connecticut, United States
|
|-
|Win
| align=center|23–2 (1)
| Arlene Blencowe
| Submission (rear-naked choke)
| Bellator 249
| 
| align=center| 2
| align=center| 2:36
| Uncasville, Connecticut, United States
| 
|-
|Win
|align=center|22–2 (1)
|Julia Budd
|TKO (punches)
|Bellator 238
|
|align=center|4
|align=center|1:14
|Inglewood, California, United States
|
|-
|Win
|align=center|21–2 (1)
|Felicia Spencer
|Decision (unanimous)
|UFC 240 
|
|align=center|3
|align=center|5:00
|Edmonton, Alberta, Canada
|
|-
|Loss
|align=center|20–2 (1)
|Amanda Nunes
|KO (punch)
|UFC 232 
|
|align=center|1
|align=center|0:51
|Inglewood, California, United States
|
|-
|Win
|align=center|20–1 (1)
|Yana Kunitskaya
|TKO (punches)
|UFC 222
|
|align=center|1
|align=center|3:25
|Las Vegas, Nevada, United States
|
|-
|Win
|align=center|19–1 (1)
|Holly Holm
|Decision (unanimous)
|UFC 219
|
|align=center|5
|align=center|5:00
|Las Vegas, Nevada, United States
|
|-
|Win
|align=center|18–1 (1)
|Tonya Evinger
|TKO (knees)
|UFC 214
|
|align=center|3
|align=center|1:56
|Anaheim, California, United States
|
|-
|Win
|align=center|17–1 (1)
|Lina Länsberg
|TKO (punches)
|UFC Fight Night: Cyborg vs. Länsberg
|
|align=center|2
|align=center|2:29
|Brasília, Brazil
|
|-
|Win
|align=center|16–1 (1)
|Leslie Smith
|TKO (punches)
|UFC 198
|
|align=center|1
|align=center|1:21
|Curitiba, Brazil
|
|-
|Win
|align=center|15–1 (1)
|Daria Ibragimova
|KO (punches)
|Invicta FC 15: Cyborg vs. Ibragimova
|
|align=center|1
|align=center|4:58
| Costa Mesa, California, United States
|
|-
|Win
|align=center|14–1 (1)
|Faith van Duin
|TKO (knee to the body and punches)
|Invicta FC 13: Cyborg vs. Van Duin
|
|align=center|1
|align=center|0:45
| Las Vegas, Nevada, United States
|
|-
|Win
|align=center|13–1 (1)
| Charmaine Tweet
| TKO (punches)
| Invicta FC 11: Cyborg vs. Tweet
|
|align=center|1
|align=center|0:46
|Los Angeles, California, United States
| 
|-
|Win
| style="text-align:center;"| 12–1 (1)
| Marloes Coenen
| TKO (punches and elbows)
| Invicta FC 6: Coenen vs. Cyborg
| 
| style="text-align:center;"| 4
| style="text-align:center;"| 4:10
| Kansas City, Missouri, United States
| 
|-
|Win
| style="text-align:center;"| 11–1 (1)
| Fiona Muxlow
| TKO (knees and punches)
| Invicta FC 5: Penne vs. Waterson
| 
| style="text-align:center;"| 1
| style="text-align:center;"| 3:46
| Kansas City, Missouri, United States
| 
|-
|NC
|align=center| 10–1 (1)
| Hiroko Yamanaka
| NC (overturned)
| Strikeforce: Melendez vs. Masvidal
| 
|align=center| 1
|align=center| 0:16
| San Diego, California, United States
|
|-
|Win
|align=center| 10–1
| Jan Finney
| KO (knee to the body)
| Strikeforce: Fedor vs. Werdum
| 
|align=center| 2
|align=center| 2:56
| San Jose, California, United States
| 
|-
|Win
|align=center| 9–1
| Marloes Coenen
| TKO (punches)
| Strikeforce: Miami
| 
|align=center| 3
|align=center| 3:40
| Sunrise, Florida, United States
| 
|-
|Win
|align=center| 8–1
| Gina Carano
| TKO (punches)
| Strikeforce: Carano vs. Cyborg
| 
|align=center| 1
|align=center| 4:59
| San Jose, California, United States
| 
|-
|Win
|align=center| 7–1
| Hitomi Akano
| TKO (punches)
| Strikeforce: Shamrock vs. Diaz
| 
|align=center| 3
|align=center| 0:35
| San Jose, California, United States
| 
|-
|Win
|align=center| 6–1
| Yoko Takahashi
| Decision (unanimous)
| EliteXC: Heat
| 
|align=center| 3
|align=center| 3:00
| Sunrise, Florida, United States
| 
|-
|Win
|align=center| 5–1
| Shayna Baszler
| TKO (punches)
| EliteXC: Unfinished Business
| 
|align=center| 2
|align=center| 2:48
| Stockton, California, United States
|
|-
|Win
|align=center| 4–1
| Marise Vitoria
| TKO (stomps)
| Storm Samurai 12
| 
|align=center| 1
|align=center| 1:27
| Curitiba, Brazil
| 
|-
|Win
|align=center| 3–1
| Elaine Santiago
| TKO (corner stoppage)
| Storm Samurai 11
| 
|align=center| 1
|align=center| 2:46
| Curitiba, Brazil
| 
|-
|Win
|align=center| 2–1
| Chris Schroeder
| TKO (punches)
| Storm Samurai 10
| 
|align=center| 1
|align=center| N/A
| Curitiba, Brazil
| 
|-
|Win
|align=center| 1–1
| Vanessa Porto
| Decision (unanimous)
| Storm Samurai 9
| 
|align=center| 3
|align=center| 5:00
| Curitiba, Brazil
| 
|-
|Loss
|align=center| 0–1
| Erica Paes
| Submission (kneebar)
| Show Fight 2
| 
|align=center| 1
|align=center| 1:46
| Sao Paulo, Brazil
|

Muay Thai record

Grappling record
{| class="wikitable sortable" style="font-size:80%; text-align:left;"
|-
| colspan=9 style="text-align:center;" | 8 Matches, 7 Wins (1 Submission), 1 Loss
|-
! Result
! Rec
! Opponent
! Method
! Event
! Division
! Type
! Date
! Location
|-
| Win
| style="text-align:center;"|7–1
|  Venla Luukkonen
| Points (11–0)
| rowspan=3|IBJJF World Championships(purple belt)
| rowspan=3|+74 kg
| rowspan=3|Gi
| rowspan=3|
| rowspan=3| Long Beach, CA
|-
| Win
| style="text-align:center;"|6–1
|  Hillary van Ornum
| Points (4–0)
|-
| Win
| style="text-align:center;"|5–1
|  Maia Matalon
| Submission (armbar)
|-
| Win
| style="text-align:center;"|4–1
|  Amanda Lucas
| Points (8–0)
| rowspan=2|IBJJF World Championships(purple belt)
| rowspan=2|+74 kg
| rowspan=2|Gi
| rowspan=2|
| rowspan=2| Long Beach, CA
|-
| Win
| style="text-align:center;"|3–1
|  Sarah Draht
| Points (16–0)
|-
| Win
| style="text-align:center;"|2–1
|  Rosângela Conceição
| Referee Decision
| rowspan=3|ADCC World Championships
| rowspan=3|+60 kg
| rowspan=3|Nogi
| rowspan=2|
| rowspan=3| Barcelona
|-
| Loss
| style="text-align:center;"|1–1
|  Penny Thomas
| Negative Points (-2 -1)
|-
| Win
| style="text-align:center;"|1–0
|  Ida Hansson
| Points (10–0)
| 
|-

Boxing record

Pay-per-view bouts

See also
 List of current Bellator fighters 
 List of current mixed martial arts champions
 List of female mixed martial artists

References

External links
 
 
 Cristiane ‘Cyborg’ Justino at Invicta FC

|-

|-

Brazilian female mixed martial artists
Brazilian practitioners of Brazilian jiu-jitsu
People awarded a black belt in Brazilian jiu-jitsu
Female Brazilian jiu-jitsu practitioners
Brazilian female kickboxers
Brazilian Muay Thai practitioners
Female Muay Thai practitioners
Brazilian expatriates in the United States
Strikeforce (mixed martial arts) champions
Bellator MMA champions
1985 births
Living people
Doping cases in mixed martial arts
Brazilian sportspeople in doping cases
Sportspeople from Curitiba
Featherweight mixed martial artists
Mixed martial artists utilizing Muay Thai
Mixed martial artists utilizing Brazilian jiu-jitsu
Ultimate Fighting Championship champions
Ultimate Fighting Championship female fighters
Naturalized citizens of the United States
Bellator female fighters